The Basic Income Party (BIP) is a single-issue political party in South Korea advocating for a universal basic income (UBI).

History 

The Basic Income Party came into existence when the ninth leadership board of the Labor Party led by Yong Hye-in resigned on 15 July. Before the official founding of the party on 19 January 2020, the Basic Income Party began establishing local chapters of the party across the cities and provinces of South Korea with the catch phrase ₩"600,000 a month for all." The party announced via their Facebook page on 7 November that they reached 5,000 members. The party officially registered with the National Election Commission on 19 January 2020. The party puts a strong emphasis on that their members are mostly young adults.

The party joined the Platform Party (party-list of the Democratic Party) on 21 March 2020 for the 2020 South Korean legislative election. Two candidates ran for proportional representation. Yong Hye-in was elected under the party-list proportional representation. After the election, Yong rejoined the party.

Ideology 
The party advocates for the implementation of a ₩600,000 (roughly equivalent to 500 United States dollars) per month basic income for all citizens of South Korea.

Although the party has no official ideology, it and its leader Shin Ji-hye have been described as socially liberal, advocating feminism and LGBT rights and seeking to improve the social safety net and remedy social disadvantages.

Election results

President

Legislature

See also 
 Cultural liberalism

References

External links

2020 establishments in South Korea
Universal basic income in South Korea
Political parties established in 2020
Political parties in South Korea
Feminist parties
Single-issue political parties
Liberal parties in South Korea
Progressive parties in South Korea
Social liberal parties
Political parties supporting universal basic income